Pitch Perfect is a 2012 American film.

Pitch Perfect may also refer to:

 Pitch Perfect (franchise), including the 2012 film and two sequels
 Pitch Perfect (soundtrack), from the 2012 film

See also
 Perfect pitch